Binburrum articuno is a species of beetle which in the taxonomy field is classified under the genus Binburrum. It exists only in Australia. It is named after the fictional animal known as Articuno from the pop culture franchise known as Pokemon. It was named alongside other beetles from the same genus by Darren Pollock and Yun Hsiao when they found the beetles in the Australian National Insect Collection, and those beetles are Binburrum moltres and Binburrum zapdos and because of their names being based on a very popular franchise it saw above average  media coverage. The reason for this naming convention is because Moltres and Zapdos are also from the video game franchise Pokemon and in the franchise, they are correlated because they are part of the Legendary Bird Trio centered around the elements of electricity, ice, and fire.

Habitat
Larvae are found under moist bark of dead trees, including celerytop logs. Adults may be found around foliage and light.

Appearance
Binburrum articuno is less than a foot long with two half-ellipse shaped elytras or forewings that have hundreds of black spots all over them. It has two transparent hind wings. As do all insects, it also has six legs,  these are yellow. It has two brown anntennae made up of segments. It has two blue compound eyes on the sides of the face.

==Other species  in Binburrum articuno'''s genus==Binburrum angusticolis which was named by Pollock in 1995Binburrum bifoveicollis which was named by Lea in 1917Binburrum convavifrons which was named by Pollock in 1995Binburrum ephippiatum which was named by Wilson in 1926Binburrum moltres which was named by Hsiao and Pollock in 2020Binburrum ruficollis which was named by Champion in 1895Binburrum zapdos which was named by Hsiao and Pollock in 2020.

Darren Pollock
Darren Pollock is the person who gave Binburrum articuno its name along with Yun Hsiao. He works at Eastern New Mexico University under the career of professor of entomology. The current chancellor of the school that he is an employee of is Dr. Patricia Caldwell. He is also the director of the United States Department of Education's HSI stem grant which is a grant that, "aims to improve the awareness and preparation of high school students for STEM degrees and careers, along with providing resources and opportunities to undergraduate students in the STEM fields". The Eastern New Mexico University is a recipient of that grant. His main focuses of his studies include the management of vector-borne diseases, tick management, forensic entomology, and arthropod diversity of New Mexico. Besides Binburrum articuno, Binburrum moltres, Binburrum zapdos, Darren Pollock is responsible for the nomenclature of seven other taxonomy terms which are listed below
Five terms relating to the genus BinburrumOmineus chuangae and Omineus taiwanensisYun Hsiao
Yun Hsiao is the person who gave Binburrum articuno its nomenclature along with Darren Pollock. He is a PHD student in the scientific field of insect study.He has named a weevil of the genus Demyrsus after an animal from the game Digimon because the weevil has the ability to peirce the trunk of a cycad and the digimon he named it after has the ability to control the earth. He is responsible for nine taxonomy titles, besides Binburrum articuno, Binburrum moltres, and Binburrum zapdos, and the taxonomy titles are listed below.Archaeoripiphirus and Archaeoripiphirus nuwaOmineus chuange and Omineus taiwanensisStenothemus cou and Stenothemus seediqSynchroa formosanaThescelosynchroa and Thescelosynchroa pangu''

See also
Fauna of Australia
List of organisms named after works of fiction

References

Beetles of Australia
Pyrochroidae